Chytrówka  is a village in the administrative district of Gmina Frysztak, within Strzyżów County, Subcarpathian Voivodeship, in south-eastern Poland.

References

Villages in Strzyżów County